I Could Have Been a Sailor is a 1979 album by singer-songwriter Peter Allen, released on A&M Records. It is notable as containing Allen's versions of his songs "Don't Cry Out Loud" and "I'd Rather Leave While I'm in Love", which were major successes, as covered by others.

History
I Could Have Been a Sailor was Peter Allen's fifth studio album, and his third for A&M Records. It followed the double-album live release, It Is Time for Peter Allen (1977), on the same label. The album is notable for its association with producer Marvin Hamlisch. Allen also performs his versions of three songs he co-wrote with Carole Bayer-Sager, "Don't Go Looking", "Don't Cry Out Loud" and "I'd Rather Leave While I'm in Love".

"Don't Cry Out Loud" had been popularized by Melissa Manchester prior to Allen's release. Manchester's recording of the song was released in late 1978 and spent 20 weeks on the Billboard Hot 100 chart. It was also the title song of Manchester's related album.  The song had been co-written by Allen and Carol Bayer-Sager; Bayer-Sager was also a co-writer with Manchester.   "I'd Rather Leave While I'm in Love" was popularized by Rita Coolidge in 1979, as well as being recorded by Dusty Springfield, among others.

The album was Allen's first to make the US albums chart, peaking at No. 171 on the Billboard 200.  The album has been subject to limited reissue on CD. It was reissued on CD in 2001 in Japan, on Universal/A&M. It has not been reissued on CD in North America or elsewhere.

Track listing
All tracks composed by Peter Allen; except where indicated
"I Could Have Been a Sailor" 
"Don't Wish Too Hard"
"Two Boys" 
"Angels With Dirty Faces" (Allen, Adrienne Anderson)
"Don't Cry Out Loud" (Allen, Carole Bayer Sager)
"If You Were Wondering" 
"Don't Leave Me Now" 
"I'd Rather Leave While I'm in Love" (Allen, Sager)
"We've Come to an Understanding"
"Paris at 21"

Personnel
Peter Allen - keyboards, piano, vocals
Michael Boddicker - programming
Velton Ray Bunch - arranger
Paulinho Da Costa - percussion
Linda Dillard - backing vocals
Victor Feldman - percussion, timpani
Dan Ferguson - guitar
Venetta Fields - backing vocals
Jay Graydon - guitar
Ed Greene - drums
Marvin Hamlisch - arranger, piano, producer
Geoff Howe - percussion
Clydie King - backing vocals
Larry Knechtel - keyboards
Abraham Laboriel - bass
Will Lee - bass
Jimmy Maelen - percussion
Rick Marotta - drums
Sherlie Matthews - backing vocals
Marti McCall - backing vocals
Ray Parker Jr. - guitar
Dave Parlato - bass
Herb Pedersen - backing vocals
Greg Phillinganes - synthesizer
Jim Pierce - bass
Mike Post - arranger, percussion
Bruce Roberts - backing vocals
Dan Sawyer - guitar
Joey Scarbury - backing vocals
Steve Schaeffer - drums
Leland Sklar - bass
David Spinozza - guitar
Fred Tackett - guitar
Richard Tee - keyboards
John Tropea - guitar

Charts

References

1979 albums
A&M Records albums
Peter Allen (musician) albums
Albums recorded at Wally Heider Studios
Albums produced by Mike Post